Mirela Maniani (21 December 1976) is a Greek retired track and field athlete who competed in the javelin throw.

Life and athletic achievements

Albania
Maniani was born as Mirela Manjani on 21 December 1976 in Durrës, Albania. In 1996, at the University of Alabama she set a new Albanian national record at 62.46 m (as of 2017, she still holds the national record of Albania). She represented Albania at the 1996 Summer Olympics in Atlanta, USA and ranked 24th overall. During the competition she was also Albania's flag bearer.

Greece
After marrying a Greek citizen, the weightlifter Georgios Tzelilis, she received Greek citizenship and represented Greece at the 1997 World Championships in Athletics in Athens. Her first major success came in 1999 in Seville, where she won the gold medal at the World Championships with a throw of 67.09 m. Her performance was considered as a world record, as a new type of javelin had been introduced in 1999. At the 2000 Summer Olympics she won the silver medal with a personal best of 67.51 m. She also won the bronze medal in 2004. Maniani is also a European champion and double world champion. Her personal best throw of 67.51 metres is the current Greek record.

Maniani joined the Hellenic Navy in 1999.

Personal life
Mirela Maniani married the weightlifter Georgios Tzelilis in 1997, and became a Greek citizen. She was known as Mirela Maniani-Tzelili until 2002, when she divorced Tzelilis. Maniani has one daughter from her third wedding with the Greek basketball player Giannis Giannoulis.

International competitions

References

External links

1976 births
Living people
Sportspeople from Durrës
Greek female javelin throwers
Albanian female javelin throwers
Olympic athletes of Albania
Olympic athletes of Greece
Olympic silver medalists for Greece
Olympic bronze medalists for Greece
Olympic silver medalists in athletics (track and field)
Olympic bronze medalists in athletics (track and field)
Athletes (track and field) at the 1996 Summer Olympics
Athletes (track and field) at the 2000 Summer Olympics
Athletes (track and field) at the 2004 Summer Olympics
Medalists at the 2000 Summer Olympics
Medalists at the 2004 Summer Olympics
World Athletics Championships athletes for Albania
World Athletics Championships athletes for Greece
World Athletics Championships medalists
Greek European Athletics champions (track and field)
Greek people of Albanian descent
Naturalized citizens of Greece
Albanian emigrants to Greece
World Athletics Championships winners